Luke A. Meerman (born  1975) is a Republican member of the Michigan House of Representatives.

Meerman is fifth-generation farmer. During his 2018 run, Meerman was endorsed by AgriPac.

On October 10, 2021, Meerman co-sponsored House Bill 5444 also known as the "fetal heartbeat protection act."

References

External links 
 Luke Meerman at gophouse.org

Living people
1970s births
Farmers from Michigan
Republican Party members of the Michigan House of Representatives
21st-century American politicians